Technological utopianism (often called techno-utopianism or technoutopianism) is any ideology based on the premise that advances in science and technology could and should bring about a utopia, or at least help to fulfill one or another utopian ideal.

A techno-utopia is therefore an ideal society, in which laws, government, and social conditions are solely operating for the benefit and well-being of all its citizens, set in the near- or far-future, as advanced science and technology will allow these ideal living standards to exist; for example, post-scarcity, transformations in human nature, the avoidance or prevention of suffering and even the end of death. 

Technological utopianism is often connected with other discourses presenting technologies as agents of social and cultural change, such as technological determinism or media imaginaries.

A tech-utopia does not disregard any problems that technology may cause, but strongly believes that technology allows mankind to make social, economic, political, and cultural advancements. Overall, Technological Utopianism views technology's impacts as extremely positive.

In the late 20th and early 21st centuries, several ideologies and movements, such as the cyberdelic counterculture, the Californian Ideology, cyber-utopianism, transhumanism, and singularitarianism, have emerged promoting a form of techno-utopia as a reachable goal. Cultural critic Imre Szeman argues technological utopianism is an irrational social narrative because there is no evidence to support it. He concludes that it shows the extent to which modern societies place faith in narratives of progress and technology overcoming things, despite all evidence to the contrary.

History

From the 19th to mid-20th centuries

Karl Marx believed that science and democracy were the right and left hands of what he called the move from the realm of necessity to the realm of freedom. He argued that advances in science helped delegitimize the rule of kings and the power of the Christian Church.

19th-century liberals, socialists, and republicans often embraced techno-utopianism. Radicals like Joseph Priestley pursued scientific investigation while advocating democracy. Robert Owen, Charles Fourier and Henri de Saint-Simon in the early 19th century inspired communalists with their visions of a future scientific and technological evolution of humanity using reason. Radicals seized on Darwinian evolution to validate the idea of social progress. Edward Bellamy’s socialist utopia in Looking Backward, which inspired hundreds of socialist clubs in the late 19th century United States and a national political party, was as highly technological as Bellamy’s imagination. For Bellamy and the Fabian Socialists, socialism was to be brought about as a painless corollary of industrial development.

Marx and Engels saw more pain and conflict involved, but agreed about the inevitable end. Marxists argued that the advance of technology laid the groundwork not only for the creation of a new society, with different property relations, but also for the emergence of new human beings reconnected to nature and themselves. At the top of the agenda for empowered proletarians was "to increase the total productive forces as rapidly as possible". The 19th and early 20th century Left, from social democrats to communists, were focused on industrialization, economic development and the promotion of reason, science, and the idea of progress.

Some technological utopians promoted eugenics. Holding that in studies of families, such as the Jukes and Kallikaks, science had proven that many traits such as criminality and alcoholism were hereditary, many advocated the sterilization of those displaying negative traits. Forcible sterilization programs were implemented in several states in the United States.

H.G. Wells in works such as The Shape of Things to Come promoted technological utopianism.

The horrors of the 20th century – namely Fascist and Communist dictatorships and the world wars – caused many to abandon optimism. The Holocaust, as Theodor Adorno underlined, seemed to shatter the ideal of Condorcet and other thinkers of the Enlightenment, which commonly equated scientific progress with social progress.

From late 20th and early 21st centuries

A movement of techno-utopianism began to flourish again in the dot-com culture of the 1990s, particularly in the West Coast of the United States, especially based around Silicon Valley. The Californian Ideology was a set of beliefs combining bohemian and anti-authoritarian attitudes from the counterculture of the 1960s with techno-utopianism and support for libertarian economic policies. It was reflected in, reported on, and even actively promoted in the pages of Wired magazine, which was founded in San Francisco in 1993 and served for a number years as the "bible" of its adherents.

This form of techno-utopianism reflected a belief that technological change revolutionizes human affairs, and that digital technology in particular – of which the Internet was but a modest harbinger – would increase personal freedom by freeing the individual from the rigid embrace of bureaucratic big government. "Self-empowered knowledge workers" would render traditional hierarchies redundant; digital communications would allow them to escape the modern city, an "obsolete remnant of the industrial age".

Similar forms of "digital utopianism" has often entered in the political messages of party and social movements that point to the Web or more broadly to new media as harbingers of political and social change. Its adherents claim it transcended conventional "right/left" distinctions in politics by rendering politics obsolete. However, techno-utopianism disproportionately attracted adherents from the libertarian right end of the political spectrum. Therefore, techno-utopians often have a hostility toward government regulation and a belief in the superiority of the free market system. Prominent "oracles" of techno-utopianism included George Gilder and Kevin Kelly, an editor of Wired who also published several books.

During the late 1990s dot-com boom, when the speculative bubble gave rise to claims that an era of "permanent prosperity" had arrived, techno-utopianism flourished, typically among the small percentage of the population who were employees of Internet startups and/or owned large quantities of high-tech stocks. With the subsequent crash, many of these dot-com techno-utopians had to rein in some of their beliefs in the face of the clear return of traditional economic reality.

In the late 1990s and especially during the first decade of the 21st century, technorealism and techno-progressivism are stances that have risen among advocates of technological change as critical alternatives to techno-utopianism. However, technological utopianism persists in the 21st century as a result of new technological developments and their impact on society. For example, several technical journalists and social commentators, such as Mark Pesce, have interpreted the WikiLeaks phenomenon and the United States diplomatic cables leak in early December 2010 as a precursor to, or an incentive for, the creation of a techno-utopian transparent society. Cyber-utopianism, first coined by Evgeny Morozov, is another manifestation of this, in particular in relation to the Internet and social networking.

Principles
Bernard Gendron, a professor of philosophy at the University of Wisconsin–Milwaukee, defines the four principles of modern technological utopians in the late 20th and early 21st centuries as follows:

We are presently undergoing a (post-industrial) revolution in technology;
In the post-industrial age, technological growth will be sustained (at least);
In the post-industrial age, technological growth will lead to the end of economic scarcity;
The elimination of economic scarcity will lead to the elimination of every major social evil.

Rushkoff presents us with multiple claims that surround the basic principles of Technological Utopianism:

Technology reflects and encourages the best aspects of human nature, fostering “communication, collaboration, sharing, helpfulness, and community.”
Technology improves our interpersonal communication, relationships, and communities. Early Internet users shared their knowledge of the Internet with others around them.
Technology democratizes society. The expansion of access to knowledge and skills led to the connection of people and information. The broadening of freedom of expression created “the online world...in which we are allowed to voice our own opinions.” The reduction of the inequalities of power and wealth meant that everyone has an equal status on the internet and is allowed to do as much as the next person.
Technology inevitably progresses. The interactivity that came from the inventions of the TV remote control, video game joystick, computer mouse and computer keyboard allowed for much more progress.
Unforeseen impacts of technology are positive. As more people discovered the Internet, they took advantage of being linked to millions of people, and turned the Internet into a social revolution. The government released it to the public, and its “social side effect… [became] its main feature.”
Technology increases efficiency and consumer choice. The creation of the TV remote, video game joystick, and computer mouse liberated these technologies and allowed users to manipulate and control them, giving them many more choices.
New technology can solve the problems created by old technology. Social networks and blogs were created out of the collapse of dot.com bubble businesses’ attempts to run pyramid schemes on users.

Criticisms
Critics claim that techno-utopianism's identification of social progress with scientific progress is a form of positivism and scientism. Critics of modern libertarian techno-utopianism point out that it tends to focus on "government interference" while dismissing the positive effects of the regulation of business. They also point out that it has little to say about the environmental impact of technology and that its ideas have little relevance for much of the rest of the world that are still relatively quite poor (see global digital divide).

In his 2010 study System Failure: Oil, Futurity, and the Anticipation of Disaster, Canada Research Chairholder in cultural studies Imre Szeman argues that technological utopianism is one of the social narratives that prevent people from acting on the knowledge they have concerning the effects of oil on the environment.

Other critics of a techno-utopia include the worry of the human element. Critics suggest that a techno-utopia may lessen human contact, leading to a distant society.

Another concern is the amount of reliance society may place on their technologies in these techno-utopia settings. For example, In a controversial 2011 article "Techno-Utopians are Mugged by Reality", L. Gordon Crovitz of The Wall Street Journal explored the concept of the violation of free speech by shutting down social media to stop violence. As a result of a wave of British cities being looted, former British Prime Minister David Cameron argued that the government should have the ability to shut down social media during crime sprees so that the situation could be contained. A poll was conducted to see if Twitter users would prefer to let the service be closed temporarily or keep it open so they could chat about the famous television show The X-Factor. The end report showed that every respondent opted for The X-Factor discussion. Clovitz contends that the negative social effect of technological utopia is that society is so addicted to technology that humanity simply cannot be parted from it even for the greater good. While many techno-utopians would like to believe that digital technology is for the greater good, he says it can also be used negatively to bring harm to the public. These two criticisms are sometimes referred to as a technological anti-utopian view or a techno-dystopia.

According to Ronald Adler and Russell Proctor, mediated communication such as phone calls, instant messaging and text messaging are steps towards a utopian world in which one can easily contact another regardless of time or location. However, mediated communication removes many aspects that are helpful in transferring messages. As it stands , most text, email, and instant messages offer fewer nonverbal cues about the speaker's feelings than do face-to-face encounters. This makes it so that mediated communication can easily be misconstrued and the intended message is not properly conveyed. With the absence of tone, body language, and environmental context, the chance of a misunderstanding is much higher, rendering the communication ineffective. In fact, mediated technology can be seen from a dystopian view because it can be detrimental to effective interpersonal communication. These criticisms would only apply to messages that are prone to misinterpretation as not every text based communication requires contextual cues. The limitations of lacking tone and body language in text based communication are likely to be mitigated by video and augmented reality versions of digital communication technologies.

In 2019, philosopher Nick Bostrom introduced the notion of a vulnerable world, "one in which there is some level of technological development at which civilization almost certainly gets devastated by default", citing the risks of a pandemic caused by a DIY biohacker, or an arms race triggered by the development of novel armaments. He writes that "Technology policy should not unquestioningly assume that all technological progress is beneficial, or that complete scientific openness is always best, or that the world has the capacity to manage any potential downside of a technology after it is invented."

See also

Accelerationism
Creative disruption
Crypto-anarchism
Eschatology
Extropianism
Historicism
Immanentize the eschaton
Luddite
Millennialism
Nanosocialism
Neo-Luddism
Post scarcity
Singularitarianism
Techno-progressivism
Technocentrism
Technogaianism
Technocracy
Technological dystopia
Technological singularity
Technological supremacy
Technophilia
Technorealism
Towards a New Socialism
Transhumanism
Yellow socialism
Jacque Fresco

References

Further reading
 Dickel, Sascha, and Schrape, Jan-Felix (2017): The Logic of Digital Utopianism. Nano Ethics
Huesemann, Michael H., and Joyce A. Huesemann (2011). Technofix: Why Technology Won’t Save Us or the Environment, New Society Publishers, Gabriola Island, British Columbia, Canada, 464 pp.
 Segal, Howard P. Technological Utopianism in American Culture. Chicago : University of Chicago Press, 1985.
 Segal, Howard P. Technological Utopianism in American Culture: Twentieth Anniversary Edition. Syracuse, NY: Syracuse University Press, 2005.  (Syracuse UP catalog page)

 
Ideologies